New Radiant Women's Football Club is a women's association football team.

References

Association football clubs established in 2014
2014 establishments in the Maldives